Porte d'Italie is one of the city gates of Paris, located in the 13th arrondissement, at the intersection of Avenue d'Italie, Boulevard Massena, Avenue de la Porte d'Italie and street Kellermann, facing the Kremlin-Bicetre.

The "gate of Italy" is the starting point of Route nationale 7 between Paris and Italy, hence the name.

It is conveniently located between the 87 and 88 bastions of the old Thiers wall.

Transport 
The Porte d'Italie Metro station and a stop on Paris tramway Line 3a are located at the gate.

References

Fortifications of Paris
Buildings and structures in the 13th arrondissement of Paris
City gates in Paris